Jack Garner  (born 1872) was a Welsh international footballer. He was part of the Wales national football team, playing 1 match on 21 March 1896 against Scotland.

See also
 List of Wales international footballers (alphabetical)

References

1872 births
Welsh footballers
Wales international footballers
Place of birth missing
Date of death missing
Association footballers not categorized by position